Periyar University is a university in Salem, Tamil Nadu, India. It was established by the Government of Tamil Nadu in 1997. It is named after social reformer Thanthai Periyar E. V. Ramasamy. The University Grants Commissions, New Delhi bestowed 2f status in 1998 and 12(B) status in 2005 to the university. It is accredited by NAAC with 'A++' grade. It has been awarded a cumulative grade point average (CGPA) of 3.61 out of 4 points (performance descriptor "Excellent"). University ranked Second in India only after to Mumbai University and First in Tamil Nadu among State Universities. Periyar University is the first State University to rank "A++" grade.

History 

The Government of Tamil Nadu established Periyar University at Salem on 17 September 1997, as per the provisions of the Periyar University Act, 1997. The university caters to affiliated colleges under the area comprising the districts of Salem, Dharmapuri, Namakkal and Krishnagiri. The university got 12(B) and 2f status from the University Grants Commission and was accredited by NAAC with B+ grade in 2007, which was upgraded to 'A' during the reaccreditation in May 2015. In 2021 University upgraded to "A++" grade during the reaccreditation in December 2021.

Affiliated colleges
A total of 106 colleges from four districts of Tamil Nadu are affiliated with the university and PG extension center at Dharmapuri (Periyar University PG Extension Center, Adhiyaman Government Boys Higher Secondary School Campus), which includes five autonomous colleges, 65 colleges with PG departments and 45 colleges with research departments. More than 1,40,000+ students are studying in the affiliated colleges.

Schools and departments
Periyar University has 27 teaching and research departments in eight schools. The departments are clustered into schools to promote inter-disciplinary research. A total of 79 academic programmes are offered by the departments. A proposal has been submitted to the state government for approval to start a History Department.

Constituent colleges
Apart from its teaching and research departments, the university has established five constituent colleges at Mettur, Idappadi (both in Salem District), Pennagaram, Harur, and Pappireddipatty (in Dharmapuri District).

Location 
The university is on National Highway 7,  from Salem city.

Rankings

The University was ranked 4th Rank (ARRAI) Atal Ranking among the Universities and 63rd Rank among universities in India by the National Institutional Ranking Framework (NIRF) in 2022 and in the 101–150 band overall. University moved 10 places upward compared to 2021.

References

External links

 

 
Universities in Tamil Nadu
Education in Salem, Tamil Nadu
Educational institutions established in 1997
1997 establishments in Tamil Nadu
Periyar E. V. Ramasamy